Lacrymaria is a genus of ciliates. Its best known species is the "Tear of Swan", Lacrymaria olor.

Species 
The genus includes the following species:

 Lacrymaria aciformis Kahl, 1933
 Lacrymaria acuta Kahl, 1933
 Lacrymaria aquae dulcis (Roux, 1901) Lauterborn, 1915 see Lacrymaria pupula
 Lacrymaria balechi Dragesco
 Lacrymaria caspia Grimm, 1876 see Lacrymaria coronata, Claparede and Lachmann, 1858
 Lacrymaria caudata Kahl, 1932/1933; var. lemani Dragesco, 1960
 Lacrymaria cohni Kent, 1881
 Lacrymaria conifera Burkovsky, 1970
 Lacrymaria coniformis  Burger, 1908
 Lacrymaria coronata  Claparede and Lachmann, 1858/1859 (= Phialina coronata)
 Lacrymaria coronata var. aquae dulcis Roux, 1901 see Lacrymaria pupula
 Lacrymaria cucumis  Penard, 1922 see Lagynus cucumis
 Lacrymaria cupifera  Kahl, 1933
 Lacrymaria delamarei  Dragesco
 Lacrymaria elegans  Engelmann, 1862 see Lagynus elegans, Quennersted, 1867
 Lacrymaria elliptica  Burger, 1908 see Lacrymaria pupula
 Lacrymaria filiformis  Maskell
 Lacrymaria kahli  Dragesco
 Lacrymaria lagenula  Claparede and Lachmann, 1858
 Lacrymaria marina  Kahl, 1933
 Lacrymaria marinum  Kahl, 1933
 Lacrymaria metabolica  Burger, 1908 see Lacrymaria vermicularis , O. F. Muller-Ehrenberg, 1831
 Lacrymaria minima  Kahl, 1927
 Lacrymaria olor  O. F. Muller, 1776/1786, Bory de Saint-Vincent, 1824; var. marina Kahl, 1933
 Lacrymaria proteus  Ehrenberg, 1830 see Lacrymaria olor
 Lacrymaria phialina  Svec, 1897 see Lacrymaria vermicularis, Muller-Erhenberg, 1831
 Lacrymaria phialina  Svec, 1907, Penard, 1922 see Lacrymaria pupula
 Lacrymaria pulchra  Wenzel, 1953
 Lacrymaria pumilio  Vuxanovici
 Lacrymaria pupula  O. F. Muller, 1786
 Lacrymaria pusilla  Claparede and Lachmann
 Lacrymaria rostrata
 Lacrymaria rotundata  Dragesco
 Lacrymaria salinarum  Kahl, 1928
 Lacrymaria sapropelica  Kahl, 1927
 Lacrymaria spiralis  Kahl, 1926 see Lacrymaria vermicularis O. F. Muller-Ehrenberg, 1831
 Lacrymaria striata  Gulati, 1926 see Lacrymaria pupula
 Lacrymaria trichocystus  Dragesco
 Lacrymaria truncatum  Stokes, 1885 see Spathidium truncatum
 Lacrymaria urnula  Kahl, 1930 
 Lacrymaria vermicularis  O. F. Muller, 1786, O. F. Muller-Ehrenberg, 1831
 Lacrymaria versatilis  Quennerstedt, 1867
 Lacrymaria vertens  Stokes, 1885

References

Ciliate genera
Litostomatea